Rooper is a surname, and may refer to:

 Edward Rooper (1818-1854), English soldier, landscape painter, botanical collector and illustrator
 Jemima Rooper (born 1981), English actress
 John Bonfoy Rooper (1778–1855), British politician
 William Victor Trevor Rooper (1897–1917), World War I flying ace